Narada, or Narada Muni, is a sage divinity, famous in Hindu traditions as a travelling musician and storyteller, who carries news and enlightening wisdom. He is one of mind-created children of Brahma, the creator god. He appears in a number of Hindu texts, notably the Mahabharata, regaling Yudhishthira with the story of Prahalada and the Ramayana as well as tales in the Puranas. A common theme in Vaishnavism is the accompaniment of a number of lesser deities such as Narada to offer aid to Vishnu upon his descent to earth to combat the forces of evil, or enjoy a close view of epochal events. He is also referred to as Rishiraja, meaning the king of all sages. He was gifted with the boon of knowledge regarding the past, present, and the future.

Hinduism 
In Indian texts, Narada travels to distant worlds and realms (Sanskrit: lokas). He is depicted carrying a khartal (musical instrument) and the veena, and is generally regarded as one of the great masters of the ancient musical instrument. This instrument is known by the name "mahathi", which he uses to accompany his singing of hymns, prayers, and mantras. In the Vaishnavism tradition of Hinduism, he is presented as a sage with devotion to the preserver deity Vishnu. Narada is described as both wise and mischievous in some humorous tales. He is notorious for being meddlesome, provoking conflict between both the gods and the demons for the sake of their wisdom as well as for his own entertainment. Vaishnavas depict him as a pure, elevated soul who glorifies Vishnu through his devotional songs, singing the names Hari and Narayana, and therein demonstrating bhakti yoga. The Narada Bhakti Sutra is attributed to him. He would usually make his presence known by vocally chanting "Narayana, Narayana" before appearing in a scene.

Other texts named after Narada include the Narada Purana and the Nāradasmṛti (pre 6th century CE text), the latter called the "juridical text par excellence" and representing the only Dharmaśāstra text that deals solely with juridical matters while ignoring those of righteous conduct and penance.

The name Narada, referring to many different persons, appears in many mythical legends of Hinduism, as an earlier birth of Sariputta in the Jataka tales of Buddhism as well as names of medieval Buddhist scholars, and in Jainism.

His Greek and Roman counterparts are Hermes and Mercury, and his Germanic counterpart is Odin.

Mahabharata 
In the Mahabharata, Narada is portrayed as being conversant with the Vedas and the Upanishads and as acquainted with history and Puranas. He has a mastery of the six Angas: pronunciation, grammar, prosody, terms, religious rites and astronomy. All celestial beings worship him for his knowledge - he is supposed to be well versed in all that occurred in ancient kalpas (time cycles) and is termed to be conversant with Nyaya (justice) and the truth of moral science. He is a perfect master in re-conciliatory texts and differentiating in applying general principles to particular cases. He can swiftly interpret contraries by references to differences in situations. He is eloquent, resolute, intelligent and a possessor of powerful memory. He knows the science of morals, politics; he is skilled in drawing inferences from evidence and very proficient in distinguishing inferior things from superior ones. He is competent in judging the correctness and incorrectness of complex syllogistic statements consisting of 5 proponents. He is capable of arriving at definite conclusions about religion, wealth, pleasure and salvation. He possesses knowledge of this whole universe and everything surrounding it. He is capable of successfully answering Brihaspati himself while arguing. He is a master of the Sankhya and Yoga systems of philosophy, conversant with sciences of war and treaty and proficient in drawing conclusions by judging things, not within direct knowledge. He knows about the six sciences of a treaty, war, military campaigns, maintenance of posts against the enemy and strategies of ambushes and reserves. He is a thorough master of every branch of learning. He is fond of war and music and incapable of being repulsed by any science or any course of action.

Puranas 

The Bhagavata Purana describes the story of Narada's spiritual enlightenment: He was the primary source of information among the devas, and is believed to be the first cosmic messenger upon the earth. In his previous birth, Narada was a gandharva (musical being), who had been cursed to be born earth for singing glories to the demigods instead of Vishnu. He was born as the son of a maid-servant of some particularly saintly priests. The priests, being pleased with both his and his mother's service, blessed him by allowing him to eat some of their food (prasada), previously offered to their deity, Vishnu.

Gradually, he received further blessings from these sages and heard them discussing many spiritual topics. During the four months of rainy seasons when the sages did not leave their hermitage and stayed together, they used to recite various deeds of Vishnu, and from there Narada used to hear these stories. After his mother died, he decided to roam the forest in search of enlightenment in understanding the 'Supreme Absolute Truth'.

Reaching a tranquil forest location, after quenching his thirst from a nearby stream, he sat under a tree in meditation (yoga), concentrating on the paramatma form of Vishnu within his heart as he had been taught by the priests he had served. After some time Narada experienced a vision wherein Narayana (Vishnu) appeared before him, smiling, and spoke: "that despite having the blessing of seeing Him at that very moment, Narada would not be able to see His (Vishnu's) divine form again until he died". Narayana further explained that the reason he had been given a chance to see his form was that his beauty and love would be a source of inspiration and would fuel his dormant desire to be with the Vishnu again. After instructing Narada in this manner, Vishnu then disappeared from his sight. The boy awoke from his meditation, both thrilled and disappointed.

For the rest of his life, Narada focused on his devotion, meditation upon and worship to Vishnu. After his death, Vishnu then blessed him with the spiritual form of "Narada" as he eventually became known. In many Hindu scriptures, Narada is considered a saktyavesa-avatar or partial-manifestation (avatar) of God, empowered to perform miraculous tasks on Vishnu's behalf.

In the Padma Purana and some other texts, Narada is transformed into a woman for a time.

Worship 
Narada temples are few, most prominent being Sri Narada Muni Temple at Chigateri, Karnataka. 

Some adherents believe that it was Narada who was reborn as Purandara Dasa as a Haridasa (servant of Vishnu). He emphasised his works on Vithala, another form of Vishnu and the presiding deity of the temple in Pandharpur.

Jainism

In Jainism, there are a total of 9 Naradas in every cycle of Jain Cosmology; current cycle's Naradas were Bhima, Mahabhima, Rudra, Maharudra, Kala, Mahakala, Durmukha, Narakamukha and Adhomukha.

See also 

 Bhaktha Naradar
 Bhagavata Purana
 Narad Bhakti Sutra
 Nāradasmṛti
 Sangita Makarandha
 Four Kumaras

References

Citations

Sources

External links 

 Narada's Instructions on Srimad-Bhagavatam for Vyasadeva
 References to Narada in Gaudiya Vaishnava texts
 Ruesi Narot - Narada in Buddhist Thailand
 Narada’s Aphorisms on Bhakti (Ed. Sarma, Y Subrahmanya)
 Nārada Bhakti Sūtras (Tr. Bhuteshananda, Swami)
 Nārada-Bhakti-Sūtra: The Secrets of Transcendental Love (Tr. Prabhupāda, A C Bhaktivedanta Swami et al.)
Narada Jayanti Janm Vishesh

Rishis
Prajapatis
Avatars of Vishnu
Characters in the Bhagavata Purana